Adesmus verticalis is a species of beetle in the family Cerambycidae. It was described by Ernst Friedrich Germar in 1824. It is known from Argentina, Brazil and Paraguay.

References

Adesmus
Beetles described in 1824